Baggeridge Brick was a main British manufacturer of bricks, and was the UK's fourth-largest manufacturer of bricks. It is now a subsidiary of Wienerberger AG.

History

Baggeridge Brick Company was founded near Baggeridge Country Park in Staffordshire. It was incorporated on 7 April 1944. It first began making bricks in Worcestershire.

It was headquartered in Gospel End in South Staffordshire.

Ownership
In August 2007 the company was taken over for £89.2m by the Austrian company Wienerberger AG, the world’s largest producer of bricks, after the prospective bid had been referred to the UK Competition Commission.

Structure
The resulting company is now headquartered in south Manchester.

References

External links
 Company history

Brick manufacturers
British companies established in 1944
Companies based in Staffordshire
Manufacturing companies established in 1944
South Staffordshire District
1944 establishments in England
Building materials companies of the United Kingdom